Sargent House is an American management company and record label based in Los Angeles. It was founded in June 2006 by Cathy Pellow, who is a music video commissioner for Atlantic Records and also owns a music video production company called Refused TV. Pellow began managing the rock outfit RX Bandits in 2006. The band needed to release its new album ...And the Battle Begun, so Pellow decided to launch her own record label (also to be able to do things differently from the traditional model of record labels).  From that point onward, Pellow continued to manage bands and release records, all under the Sargent House banner.

History
Chronologically from when Pellow first began working with them, Sargent House manages the RX Bandits, These Arms Are Snakes, Maps & Atlases, Russian Circles, Tera Melos, Fang Island, Daughters, Red Sparowes, Good Old War, Native, This Town Needs Guns, Bygones, Lisa Papineau, Big Sir, Cast Spells, Zechs Marquise, Zach Hill, Le Butcherettes, Adebisi Shank, Hella, And So I Watch You From Afar and Helms Alee. Additionally, Pellow also helmed the Rodriguez Lopez Productions imprint, founded by The Mars Volta guitarist Omar Rodríguez-López. Sonny Kay came from the Gold Standard Labs label as art director for Rodriguez Lopez Productions (RLP) and Sargent House. RLP launched in March 2009, with its first release by El Grupo Nuevo de Omar Rodriguez Lopez titled Cryptomnesia out May 5, 2009. The partnership between Rodriguez Lopez Productions and Sargent House ended in early 2014.

Sargent House managed bands also have a release on the SH label. The label has a "no submissions" policy, preferring to add new bands stemming from within Sargent House.

Roster 

 A Dead Forest Index
 Adebisi Shank
 Alexis S.F. Marshall
 All Tvvins
 Alto Arc (George Clarke, Isamaya Ffrench, Danny L Harle & Trayer Tryon)
 And So I Watch You from Afar
 The Armed
 Big Walnuts Yonder
 Big Sir
 Blis
 Boris
 Bosnian Rainbows
 Botch
 Brutus
 Bygones
 Cast Spells
 Chelsea Wolfe
 Crypts
 Daughters
 David Eugene Edwards
 Deafheaven
 Deantoni Parks
 DIIV
 Disheveled Cuss
 Earth
 Emma Ruth Rundle
 Empty Houses
 Eureka the Butcher
 Fang Island
 Good Old War
 Gypsyblood
 Hella
 Helms Alee
 Indian Handcrafts
 Io Echo
 Ioanna Gika
 Jaye Jayle
 King Woman
 Le Butcherettes
 Lingua Ignota
 Lisa Papineau
 Love You Moon
 Maps & Atlases
 Marriages
 ME&LP
 Miserable
 Mutoid Man
 Mylets
 Native
 No Spill Blood
 Nurses
 Omar Rodriguez Lopez
 Red Fang
 Red Sparowes
 Russian Circles
 RX Bandits
 Storefront Church
 Tera Melos
 Therapies Son
 These Arms Are Snakes
 This Town Needs Guns
 Wovenhand
 Zach Hill
 Zechs Marquise
 Zorch

References 

American independent record labels